The Algeciras class is a class of container ships consisting of 12 vessels built for HMM. The largest ships have a maximum theoretical capacity of 23,964 twenty-foot equivalent units (TEU). They were the largest container ships in the world when they were delivered, surpassing the previous  (23,756 TEU). They have since been surpassed by the Ever Ace (23,992 TEU).

List of ships

See also 
 Ever A-class-The World Largest Container Ship, Since July 30, 2021
HMM Nuri-class container ship
Hyundai Dream-class container ship
Hyundai Together-class container ship
Hyundai Earth-class container ship

References 

Container ship classes
Ships built by Samsung Heavy Industries
Ships built by Daewoo Shipbuilding & Marine Engineering